Annika Klose (born 24 June 1992) is a German politician of the Social Democratic Party who has been serving as member of the Bundestag since 2021.

Early life and education
Klose was born 1992 in the German city of Dortmund and studied social sciences at Humboldt University Berlin.

Political career
Klose was elected to the Bundestag in the 2021 elections via electoral list. She represents Berlin-Mitte. 

In parliament, Klose has since been serving on the Committee on Labour and Social Affairs and the Committee on Petitions. She represents Berlin-Mitte. In this capacity, she is her parliamentary group's rapporteur on the Bürgergeld.

Other activities
 German United Services Trade Union (ver.di), Member

References 

Living people
1992 births
Social Democratic Party of Germany politicians
Members of the Bundestag 2021–2025
21st-century German politicians
21st-century German women politicians
Female members of the Bundestag